Government Polytechnic Barabanki (GPBbk) founded in 1982, is a government technical education institute in India. The polytechnic is affiliated to Uttar Pradesh Board of Technical Education and approved by All India Council for Technical Education. It falls under central zone of UPBTE.,

Location
The polytechnic is located at outskirts of Barabanki city off Dewa road at Jahangirabad road near Barabanki division of UP State Spinning Mill in Barabanki industrial area of Somaya Nagar.

Courses
It has three Wings:
 Engineering/Technology
 Management
 Vocational

Following is the list of courses conducted in GPBbk:

The institutes enrolls over 350 students, 9 teachers and over 15 supporting staff.

Strengthening of Government Polytechnic institute in Barabanki
In 2010 a scheme for the  strengthening of Government Polytechnic Barabanki (including construction of computer building, installation of computer and supply of equipment) in Barabanki at a cost of Rs. 78 lakh was approved by Ministry of Human Resource Development, Ministry of Minority Affairs and Government of Uttar Pradesh.

In March 2011 Government Polytechnic Barabanki was selected under Scheme of Up-gradation of Existing Polytechnics and amount of Rs. 10 lakh was sanctioned for the up-gradation.

In March 2011 Government Polytechnic Barabanki was selected under Scheme of Construction of Women’s Hostels and total amount of Rs. 70 lakh was sanctioned for it in two instalments first installment of Rs. 20 lakh and second of Rs. 50 lakh.

Government Polytechnic Institute at Zaidpur
State Government has proposed for an amount of Rs.738.21 lakh for  construction of polytechnic institute including one girl's hostel at Zaidpur. The proposal has been approved by the State Technical Education Department of Uttar Pradesh.

References

External links
 official website 
 Government Polytechnic - Barabanki
 Govt. Polytechnic Barabanki @ Wikimapia
 GPBarabanki Education news Website

Technical universities and colleges in Uttar Pradesh
Education in Barabanki, Uttar Pradesh
Educational institutions established in 1982
1982 establishments in Uttar Pradesh